Layland is an unincorporated community in Coshocton County, Ohio, United States.

Notes

Unincorporated communities in Coshocton County, Ohio
Unincorporated communities in Ohio